Bellator 256: Bader vs. Machida 2 was a mixed martial arts event produced by Bellator MMA that took place on April 9, 2021 at Mohegan Sun Arena in Uncasville, Connecticut.

Background 
The event was headlined by a Quarterfinal of the Bellator Light Heavyweight World Grand Prix Tournament. The headliner was a rematch between former Bellator Light Heavyweight World Champion Ryan Bader and former UFC Light Heavyweight Champion Lyoto Machida. 

The co-main event was to feature Corey Anderson facing off against former ACA Light Heavyweight Champion Dovletdzhan Yagshimuradov. However, on March 26, it was announced that the bout will be moved to Bellator 257.

Jeffrey Glossner failed to make weight, coming 1.8 pounds over the limit for his bantamweight bout and has been fined a percentage of his purse.

Results

See also 

 2021 in Bellator MMA
 List of Bellator MMA events
 List of current Bellator fighters
 Bellator MMA Rankings

References 

Bellator MMA events
Events in Uncasville, Connecticut
2021 in mixed martial arts
April 2021 sports events in the United States
2021 in sports in Connecticut
Mixed martial arts in Connecticut
Sports competitions in Connecticut